Clearlake may refer to:

 Clearlake (band), an English rock band
 Clearlake, California, a city in Lake County, California
 Angels Camp, California, formerly Clearlake

See also
 Clear Lake (disambiguation)